Forest Lawn may refer to:

Cemeteries

California
 Forest Lawn Memorial-Parks & Mortuaries, a chain of cemeteries in southern California
 Forest Lawn Cemetery (Cathedral City), California
 Forest Lawn Memorial Park (Glendale), California
 Forest Lawn Memorial Park (Hollywood Hills), California
 Forest Lawn Memorial Park (Long Beach), California

Elsewhere
 Forest Lawn Memorial Gardens, South (Plantation, Florida)
 Forest Lawn Memorial Park (Erlanger, Kentucky)
 Forest Lawn Memorial Park (Omaha), Nebraska
 Forest Lawn Cemetery (Buffalo), New York
 Forest Lawn Memorial Gardens, Goodlettsville, Tennessee
 Forest Lawn Memorial Park (Beaumont), Texas
 Forest Lawn Cemetery (Richmond, Virginia)

Other places
 Forest Lawn Memorial Park (Burnaby), British Columbia, Canada
Forest Lawn, Calgary, a former Canadian town annexed by Calgary in 1961
Calgary Forest Lawn, a federal electoral district
Forest Lawn Scout Reservation, a group of Boy Scout camps in Cedar Glen, California, see Los Angeles Area Council: Camps